The Spender is a 1919 American silent comedy film, directed by Charles Swickard. It stars Bert Lytell, Thomas Jefferson, and William V. Mong, and was released on January 6, 1919.

Cast list
 Bert Lytell as Dick Bisbee
 Thomas Jefferson as T. W. Bisbee
 William V. Mong as Stetson
 Mary Anderson as Helen Stetson
 Clarence Burton as Elmer Robbins
 Rosemary Theby as Adventuress

References

External links 
 
 
 

Films directed by Charles Swickard
Metro Pictures films
American silent feature films
American black-and-white films
Silent American comedy films
1919 comedy films
1919 films
1910s English-language films
1910s American films